|-
!laa 
| || ||I/L|| || ||Subanun, Lapuyan|| || || || ||
|-
!lab 
| || ||I/A|| || ||Linear A|| || ||线形文字A|| ||
|-
!lac 
| || ||I/L|| || ||Lacandon||lacandon|| || || ||
|-
!lad 
| ||lad||I/L|| ||ג'ודיאו–איספאנייול||Ladino||judéo-espagnol||judeo-español||拉迪诺语; 犹太-西班牙语||ладино||Judezmo
|-
!lae 
| || ||I/L|| || ||Pattani|| || || || ||
|-
!laf 
| || ||I/L|| || ||Lafofa|| || || || ||
|-
!lag 
| || ||I/L|| || ||Langi|| || || || ||
|-
!lah 
| ||lah||M/L|| ||ਲਹਿੰਦੀ||Lahnda||lahnda||lahnda||拉亨达语||лахнда||
|-
!lai 
| || ||I/L|| || ||Lambya|| || || || ||
|-
!laj 
| || ||I/L|| || ||Lango (Uganda)|| || ||兰戈语|| ||
|-
!lak 
| || ||I/L|| || ||Laka (Nigeria)|| || || || ||
|-
!lal 
| || ||I/L|| || ||Lalia|| || || || ||
|-
!lam 
| ||lam||I/L|| || ||Lamba||lamba|| ||兰巴语||ламба||
|-
!lan 
| || ||I/L|| || ||Laru|| || || || ||
|-
!lao 
|lo||lao||I/L||Tai–Kadai||ພາສາລາວ||Lao||lao||laosiano||老挝语; 寮国语||лаосский||Laotisch
|-
!lap 
| || ||I/L|| || ||Laka (Chad)|| || || || ||
|-
!laq 
| || ||I/L|| || ||Qabiao|| || ||普标语|| ||
|-
!lar 
| || ||I/L|| || ||Larteh|| || || || ||
|-
!las 
| || ||I/L|| || ||Lama (Togo)|| || || || ||
|-
!lat 
|la||lat||I/A||Indo-European||lingua Latīna||Latin||latin||latín||拉丁语||латинский||Latein(isch)
|-
!lau 
| || ||I/L|| || ||Laba|| || || || ||
|-
!lav 
|lv||lav||M/L||Indo-European||latviešu||Latvian||letton||letón||拉脱维亚语||латышский||Lettisch
|-
!law 
| || ||I/L|| || ||Lauje|| || || || ||
|-
!lax 
| || ||I/L|| || ||Tiwa|| ||tiwa||提瓦语|| ||
|-
!lay 
| || ||I/L|| || ||Lama (Myanmar)|| || || || ||
|-
!laz 
| || ||I/E|| || ||Aribwatsa|| || || || ||
|-
!(lba) 
| || ||I/E|| || ||Lui|| || || || ||
|-
!lbb 
| || ||I/L|| || ||Label|| || || || ||
|-
!lbc 
| || ||I/L|| || ||Lakkia||lakkia|| ||拉珈语|| ||
|-
!lbe 
| || ||I/L|| ||лакку||Lak||lak||laco||拉克语||лакский||
|-
!lbf 
| || ||I/L|| || ||Tinani|| || || || ||
|-
!lbg 
| || ||I/L|| || ||Laopang|| || || || ||
|-
!lbi 
| || ||I/L|| || ||La'bi|| || || || ||
|-
!lbj 
| || ||I/L|| || ||Ladakhi||ladakhi||ladakhi||拉达克语|| ||
|-
!lbk 
| || ||I/L|| || ||Central Bontok|| || || || ||
|-
!lbl 
| || ||I/L|| || ||Libon Bikol|| || || || ||
|-
!lbm 
| || ||I/L|| || ||Lodhi|| || || || ||
|-
!lbn 
| || ||I/L|| || ||Lamet|| || || || ||
|-
!lbo 
| || ||I/L|| || ||Laven|| || || || ||
|-
!lbq 
| || ||I/L|| || ||Wampar|| || || || ||Wampar
|-
!lbr 
| || ||I/L|| || ||Lorung, Northern|| || || || ||
|-
!lbs 
| || ||I/L|| || ||Libyan Sign Language|| || ||利比亚手语||ливийский жестовый ||
|-
!lbt 
| || ||I/L|| || ||Lachi|| || ||拉基语|| ||
|-
!lbu 
| || ||I/L|| || ||Labu|| || || || ||
|-
!lbv 
| || ||I/L|| || ||Lavatbura-Lamusong|| || || || ||Lavatbura-Lamusong
|-
!lbw 
| || ||I/L|| || ||Tolaki|| || || || ||
|-
!lbx 
| || ||I/L|| || ||Lawangan|| || || || ||
|-
!lby 
| || ||I/E|| || ||Lamu-Lamu|| || || || ||
|-
!lbz 
| || ||I/L|| || ||Lardil|| || || || ||
|-
!lcc 
| || ||I/L|| || ||Legenyem|| || || || ||
|-
!lcd 
| || ||I/L|| || ||Lola|| || || || ||
|-
!lce 
| || ||I/L|| || ||Loncong|| || || || ||
|-
!lcf 
| || ||I/L|| || ||Lubu|| || || || ||
|-
!lch 
| || ||I/L|| || ||Luchazi|| || || || ||
|-
!lcl 
| || ||I/L|| || ||Lisela|| || || || ||
|-
!lcm 
| || ||I/L|| || ||Tungag|| || || || ||
|-
!lcp 
| || ||I/L|| || ||Lawa, Western|| || || || ||
|-
!lcq 
| || ||I/L|| || ||Luhu|| || || || ||
|-
!lcs 
| || ||I/L|| || ||Lisabata-Nuniali|| || || || ||
|-
!lda 
| || ||I/L|| || ||Kla-Dan|| || || || ||
|-
!ldb 
| || ||I/L|| || ||Idun|| || || || ||
|-
!ldd 
| || ||I/L|| || ||Luri|| || || || ||
|-
!ldg 
| || ||I/L|| || ||Lenyima|| || || || ||
|-
!ldh 
| || ||I/L|| || ||Lamja-Dengsa-Tola|| || || || ||
|-
!ldi 
| || ||I/L|| || ||Laari|| || || || ||
|-
!ldj 
| || ||I/L|| || ||Lemoro|| || || || ||
|-
!ldk 
| || ||I/L|| || ||Leelau|| || || || ||
|-
!ldl 
| || ||I/L|| || ||Kaan|| || || || ||
|-
!ldm 
| || ||I/L|| || ||Landoma|| || || || ||
|-
!ldn 
| || ||I/C|| || ||Láadan|| || || || ||
|-
!ldo 
| || ||I/L|| || ||Loo|| || || || ||
|-
!ldp 
| || ||I/L|| || ||Tso|| || || || ||
|-
!ldq 
| || ||I/L|| || ||Lufu|| || || || ||
|-
!lea 
| || ||I/L|| || ||Lega-Shabunda|| || || || ||
|-
!leb 
| || ||I/L|| || ||Lala-Bisa|| || || || ||
|-
!lec 
| || ||I/L|| || ||Leco|| || || || ||
|-
!led 
| || ||I/L|| || ||Lendu|| || || || ||
|-
!lee 
| || ||I/L|| || ||Lyélé|| || || || ||
|-
!lef 
| || ||I/L|| || ||Lelemi|| || || || ||
|-
!(leg) 
| || ||I/L|| || ||Lengua|| || || || ||
|-
!leh 
| || ||I/L|| || ||Lenje|| || || ||лендже||
|-
!lei 
| || ||I/L|| || ||Lemio|| || || || ||
|-
!lej 
| || ||I/L|| || ||Lengola|| || || ||ленгола||
|-
!lek 
| || ||I/L|| || ||Leipon|| || || || ||Leipon
|-
!lel 
| || ||I/L|| || ||Lele (Democratic Republic of Congo)|| || || || ||
|-
!lem 
| || ||I/L|| || ||Nomaande|| || || || ||
|-
!len 
| || ||I/E|| || ||Lenca|| || || || ||
|-
!leo 
| || ||I/L|| || ||Leti (Cameroon)|| || || || ||
|-
!lep 
| || ||I/L|| || ||Lepcha|| ||lepcha||雷布查语|| ||
|-
!leq 
| || ||I/L|| || ||Lembena|| || || || ||
|-
!ler 
| || ||I/L|| || ||Lenkau|| || || || ||
|-
!les 
| || ||I/L|| || ||Lese|| || || || ||
|-
!let 
| || ||I/L|| || ||Lesing-Gelimi|| || || || ||
|-
!leu 
| || ||I/L|| || ||Kara (Papua New Guinea)|| || || || ||
|-
!lev 
| || ||I/L|| || ||Lamma|| || || || ||
|-
!lew 
| || ||I/L|| || ||Kaili, Ledo|| || || || ||
|-
!lex 
| || ||I/L|| || ||Luang|| || || || ||
|-
!ley 
| || ||I/L|| || ||Lemolang|| || || || ||
|-
!lez 
| ||lez||I/L|| ||лезги||Lezghian||lezghien||lezguio||列兹金语; 莱兹金语||лезгинский||Lesgisch
|-
!lfa 
| || ||I/L|| || ||Lefa|| || || || ||
|-
!lfn 
| || ||I/C|| || ||Lingua Franca Nova|| || ||新共同语言|| ||
|-
!lga 
| || ||I/L|| || ||Lungga|| || || || ||
|-
!lgb 
| || ||I/L|| || ||Laghu|| || || || ||
|-
!lgg 
| || ||I/L|| || ||Lugbara|| || ||卢格巴拉语|| ||
|-
!lgh 
| || ||I/L|| || ||Laghuu|| || || || ||
|-
!lgi 
| || ||I/L|| || ||Lengilu|| || || || ||
|-
!lgk 
| || ||I/L|| || ||Lingarak|| || || || ||
|-
!lgl 
| || ||I/L|| || ||Wala|| || || || ||
|-
!lgm 
| || ||I/L|| || ||Lega-Mwenga|| || || || ||
|-
!lgn 
| || ||I/L|| || ||Opuuo|| || || || ||
|-
!lgq 
| || ||I/L|| || ||Logba|| || ||洛格巴语|| ||
|-
!lgr 
| || ||I/L|| || ||Lengo|| || || || ||
|-
!lgt 
| || ||I/L|| || ||Pahi|| || || || ||
|-
!lgu 
| || ||I/L|| || ||Longgu|| || || || ||
|-
!lgz 
| || ||I/L|| || ||Ligenza|| || || || ||
|-
!lha 
| || ||I/L|| || ||Laha (Viet Nam)|| || ||拉哈语|| ||
|-
!lhh 
| || ||I/L|| || ||Laha (Indonesia)|| || || || ||
|-
!lhi 
| || ||I/L|| || ||Lahu Shi|| || ||拉祜西语|| ||
|-
!lhl 
| || ||I/L|| || ||Lohar, Lahul|| || || || ||
|-
!lhm 
| || ||I/L|| || ||Lhomi|| || ||洛米藏语|| ||
|-
!lhn 
| || ||I/L|| || ||Lahanan|| || || || ||Lahananisch
|-
!lhp 
| || ||I/L|| || ||Lhokpu|| || || || ||
|-
!lhs 
| || ||I/E|| || ||Mlahsö|| || || || ||
|-
!lht 
| || ||I/L|| || ||Toga|| || || || ||
|-
!lhu 
| || ||I/L|| ||Laˇhuˍ hkawˇ||Lahu|| || ||拉祜语; 拉祜纳语|| ||
|-
!lia 
| || ||I/L|| || ||Limba, West-Central|| || || || ||
|-
!lib 
| || ||I/L|| || ||Likum|| || || || ||
|-
!lic 
| || ||I/L|| || ||Hlai|| || ||黎语|| ||
|-
!lid 
| || ||I/L|| || ||Nyindrou|| || || || ||
|-
!lie 
| || ||I/L|| || ||Likila|| || || || ||
|-
!lif 
| || ||I/L|| ||ᤛᤡᤖᤡᤈᤨᤅ||Limbu||limbou||limbu|| || ||
|-
!lig 
| || ||I/L|| || ||Ligbi|| || || || ||
|-
!lih 
| || ||I/L|| || ||Lihir|| || || || ||
|-
!(lii) 
| || ||I/L|| || ||Lingkhim|| || || || ||
|-
!lij 
| || ||I/L|| ||líguru||Ligurian||ligure||ligur||利古里亚语||лигурский||Ligurisch
|-
!lik 
| || ||I/L|| || ||Lika|| || || || ||
|-
!lil 
| || ||I/L|| ||Sƛ’aƛ’imxǝc||Lillooet|| || || || ||
|-
!lim 
|li||lim||I/L||Indo-European||Lèmburgs||Limburgish, Limburgan||limbourgeois|| ||林堡语||лимбургский||Limburgisch
|-
!lin 
|ln||lin||I/L||Niger–Congo||Lingala||Lingala||lingala||lingala||林加拉语; 林格拉语||лингала||Lingala
|-
!lio 
| || ||I/L|| || ||Liki|| || || || ||
|-
!lip 
| || ||I/L|| || ||Sekpele|| || || || ||
|-
!liq 
| || ||I/L|| || ||Libido|| || || || ||
|-
!lir 
| || ||I/L|| || ||Liberian English|| || || ||либерийский креольский английский||
|-
!lis 
| || ||I/L|| || ||Lisu||lisu|| ||傈僳语|| ||
|-
!lit 
|lt||lit||I/L||Indo-European||lietuvių||Lithuanian||lituanien||lituano||立陶宛语||литовский||Litauisch
|-
!liu 
| || ||I/L|| || ||Logorik|| || || || ||
|-
!liv 
| || ||I/L|| || ||Liv(onian)||livonien||livonio|| ||ливский||Livländisch
|-
!liw 
| || ||I/L|| || ||Lembak|| || || || ||
|-
!lix 
| || ||I/L|| || ||Liabuku|| || || || ||
|-
!liy 
| || ||I/L|| || ||Banda-Bambari|| || || || ||
|-
!liz 
| || ||I/L|| || ||Libinza|| || || || ||
|-
!lja 
| || ||I/E|| || ||Golpa|| || || || ||
|-
!lje 
| || ||I/L|| || ||Rampi|| || || || ||
|-
!lji 
| || ||I/L|| || ||Laiyolo|| || || || ||
|-
!ljl 
| || ||I/L|| || ||Li'o|| || || || ||Li'o
|-
!ljp 
| || ||I/L|| || ||Lampung|| || ||楠榜语|| ||Lampung
|-
!ljw 
| || ||I/L|| || ||Yirandali|| || || || ||
|-
!ljx 
| || ||I/E|| || ||Yuru|| || || || ||
|-
!lka 
| || ||I/L|| || ||Lakalei|| || || || ||
|-
!lkb 
| || ||I/L|| || ||Kabras|| || || || ||
|-
!lkc 
| || ||I/L|| || ||Kucong|| || ||苦聪语|| ||
|-
!lkd 
| || ||I/L|| || ||Lakondê|| || || || ||
|-
!lke 
| || ||I/L|| || ||Kenyi|| || || || ||
|-
!lkh 
| || ||I/L|| || ||Lakha|| || || || ||
|-
!lki 
| || ||I/L|| ||له کی له کستان||Laki|| || || || ||
|-
!lkj 
| || ||I/L|| || ||Remun|| || || || ||
|-
!lkl 
| || ||I/L|| || ||Laeko-Libuat|| || || || ||
|-
!lkm 
| || ||I/E|| || ||Kalaamaya|| || || || ||
|-
!lkn 
| || ||I/L|| || ||Lakona|| || || || ||
|-
!lko 
| || ||I/L|| || ||Khayo|| || || || ||
|-
!lkr 
| || ||I/L|| || ||Päri|| || || || ||
|-
!lks 
| || ||I/L|| || ||Kisa|| || || || ||
|-
!lkt 
| || ||I/L|| ||Lakȟótiyapi||Lakota||lakota||lakota|| || ||
|-
!lku 
| || ||I/E|| || ||Kungkari|| || || || ||
|-
!lky 
| || ||I/L|| || ||Lokoya|| || || || ||
|-
!lla 
| || ||I/L|| || ||Lala-Roba|| || || || ||
|-
!llb 
| || ||I/L|| || ||Lolo||lolo|| ||洛勒语|| ||
|-
!llc 
| || ||I/L|| || ||Lele (Guinea)|| || || || ||
|-
!lld 
| || ||I/L|| ||ladin||Ladin||ladin||ladino||拉迪恩语||ладинский||Ladinisch
|-
!lle 
| || ||I/L|| || ||Lele (Papua New Guinea)|| || || || ||
|-
!llf 
| || ||I/E|| || ||Hermit|| || || || ||
|-
!llg 
| || ||I/L|| || ||Lole|| || || || ||
|-
!llh 
| || ||I/L|| || ||Lamu|| || || || ||
|-
!lli 
| || ||I/L|| || ||Teke-Laali|| || || || ||
|-
!llj 
| || ||I/E|| || ||Ladji Ladji|| || || || ||
|-
!llk 
| || ||I/E|| || ||Lelak|| || || || ||
|-
!lll 
| || ||I/L|| || ||Lilau|| || || || ||
|-
!llm 
| || ||I/L|| || ||Lasalimu|| || || || ||
|-
!lln 
| || ||I/L|| || ||Lele (Chad)|| || || || ||
|-
!(llo) 
| || ||I/L|| || ||Khlor|| || || || ||
|-
!llp 
| || ||I/L|| || ||Efate, North|| || || || ||Nord-Efate
|-
!llq 
| || ||I/L|| || ||Lolak|| || || || ||
|-
!lls 
| || ||I/L|| || ||Lithuanian Sign Language|| || ||立陶宛手语||литовский жестовый||
|-
!llu 
| || ||I/L|| || ||Lau|| || || || ||Lau
|-
!llx 
| || ||I/L|| || ||Lauan|| || || || ||
|-
!lma 
| || ||I/L|| || ||Limba, East|| || || || ||
|-
!lmb 
| || ||I/L|| || ||Merei|| || || || ||
|-
!lmc 
| || ||I/E|| || ||Limilngan|| || || || ||
|-
!lmd 
| || ||I/L|| || ||Lumun|| || || || ||
|-
!lme 
| || ||I/L|| || ||Pévé|| || || || ||
|-
!lmf 
| || ||I/L|| || ||Lembata, South|| || || || ||
|-
!lmg 
| || ||I/L|| || ||Lamogai|| || || || ||Lamogai
|-
!lmh 
| || ||I/L|| || ||Lambichhong|| || || || ||
|-
!lmi 
| || ||I/L|| || ||Lombi|| || || || ||
|-
!lmj 
| || ||I/L|| || ||Lembata, West|| || || || ||
|-
!lmk 
| || ||I/L|| || ||Lamkang|| || || || ||
|-
!lml 
| || ||I/L|| || ||Hano|| || || || ||Hano
|-
!(lmm) 
| || ||I/L|| || ||Lamam|| || || || ||
|-
!lmn 
| || ||I/L|| || ||Lambadi|| || || || ||
|-
!lmo 
| || ||I/L|| ||lumbard||Lombard||lombard||lombardo||伦巴底语||ломбардский||Lombardisch
|-
!lmp 
| || ||I/L|| || ||Limbum|| || || || ||
|-
!lmq 
| || ||I/L|| || ||Lamatuka|| || || || ||
|-
!lmr 
| || ||I/L|| || ||Lamalera|| || || || ||
|-
!(lms) 
| || || || || ||Limousin|| || || || ||
|-
!(lmt) 
| || || || || ||Lematang|| || || || ||
|-
!lmu 
| || ||I/L|| || ||Lamenu|| || || || ||
|-
!lmv 
| || ||I/L|| || ||Lomaiviti|| || || || ||
|-
!lmw 
| || ||I/L|| || ||Miwok, Lake|| || || || ||
|-
!lmx 
| || ||I/L|| || ||Laimbue|| || || || ||
|-
!lmy 
| || ||I/L|| || ||Lamboya|| || || || ||Lamboya
|-
!(lmz) 
| || ||I/E|| || ||Lumbee|| || || || ||
|-
!lna 
| || ||I/L|| || ||Langbashe|| || || || ||
|-
!lnb 
| || ||I/L|| || ||Mbalanhu|| || || || ||
|-
!(lnc) 
| || || || || ||Languedocien|| || || || ||
|-
!lnd 
| || ||I/L|| || ||Lundayeh|| || || || ||
|-
!lng 
| || ||I/A|| || ||Langobardic|| || ||伦巴底日耳曼语||лангобардский||
|-
!lnh 
| || ||I/L|| || ||Lanoh|| || || || ||
|-
!lni 
| || ||I/L|| || ||Lantanai|| || || || ||
|-
!lnj 
| || ||I/E|| || ||Leningitij|| || || || ||
|-
!lnl 
| || ||I/L|| || ||Banda, South Central|| || || || ||
|-
!lnm 
| || ||I/L|| || ||Langam|| || || || ||
|-
!lnn 
| || ||I/L|| || ||Lorediakarkar|| || || || ||
|-
!lno 
| || ||I/L|| || ||Lango (Sudan)|| || || || ||
|-
!lns 
| || ||I/L|| || ||Lamnso'|| || || || ||
|-
!(lnt) 
| || || || || ||Lintang|| || || || ||
|-
!lnu 
| || ||I/L|| || ||Longuda|| || || || ||
|-
!lnw 
| || ||I/E|| || ||Lanima|| || || || ||
|-
!lnz 
| || ||I/L|| || ||Lonzo|| || || || ||
|-
!loa 
| || ||I/L|| || ||Loloda|| || || || ||
|-
!lob 
| || ||I/L|| || ||Lobi|| || || || ||
|-
!loc 
| || ||I/L|| || ||Inonhan|| || || || ||
|-
!(lod) 
| || || || || ||Berawan|| || || || ||
|-
!loe 
| || ||I/L|| || ||Saluan, Coastal|| || || || ||
|-
!lof 
| || ||I/L|| || ||Logol|| || || || ||
|-
!log 
| || ||I/L|| || ||Logo|| || || || ||
|-
!loh 
| || ||I/L|| || ||Narim|| || || || ||
|-
!loi 
| || ||I/L|| || ||Loma (Côte d'Ivoire)|| || || || ||
|-
!loj 
| || ||I/L|| || ||Lou|| || || || ||Lou
|-
!lok 
| || ||I/L|| || ||Loko|| || || || ||
|-
!lol 
| ||lol||I/L|| || ||Mongo||mongo|| ||芒戈语; 蒙戈语||монго||
|-
!lom 
| || ||I/L|| ||Lö(g)ömàgòòi||Loma (Liberia)|| || || || ||
|-
!lon 
| || ||I/L|| || ||Lomwe, Malawi|| || || || ||
|-
!loo 
| || ||I/L|| || ||Lombo|| || || || ||
|-
!lop 
| || ||I/L|| || ||Lopa|| || || || ||
|-
!loq 
| || ||I/L|| || ||Lobala|| || || || ||
|-
!lor 
| || ||I/L|| || ||Téén|| || || || ||
|-
!los 
| || ||I/L|| || ||Loniu|| || || || ||
|-
!lot 
| || ||I/L|| || ||Otuho|| || || || ||
|-
!lou 
| || ||I/L|| || ||Louisiana Creole French|| || ||路易斯安那克里奥尔法语||луизианский креольский французский||
|-
!lov 
| || ||I/L|| || ||Lopi|| || || || ||
|-
!low 
| || ||I/L|| || ||Lobu, Tampias|| || || || ||
|-
!lox 
| || ||I/L|| || ||Loun|| || || || ||
|-
!loy 
| || ||I/L|| || ||Lowa|| || || || ||
|-
!loz 
| ||loz||I/L|| ||siLozi||Lozi||lozi||lozi||洛齐语||лози||Lozi
|-
!lpa 
| || ||I/L|| || ||Lelepa|| || || || ||
|-
!lpe 
| || ||I/L|| || ||Lepki|| || || || ||
|-
!lpn 
| || ||I/L|| || ||Long Phuri Naga|| || || || ||
|-
!lpo 
| || ||I/L|| || ||Lipo|| || ||傈颇语|| ||
|-
!lpx 
| || ||I/L|| || ||Lopit|| || || || ||
|-
!lra 
| || ||I/L|| || ||Lara'|| || || || ||
|-
!lrc 
| || ||I/L|| || ||Luri, Northern|| || ||北卢尔语||северный лурский||
|-
!lre 
| || ||I/E|| || ||Laurentian||laurentiennes||laurentiano|| || ||
|-
!lrg 
| || ||I/E|| || ||Laragia|| || || || ||
|-
!lri 
| || ||I/L|| || ||Marachi|| || || || ||
|-
!lrk 
| || ||I/L|| || ||Loarki|| || || || ||
|-
!lrl 
| || ||I/L|| || ||Lari|| || || || ||
|-
!lrm 
| || ||I/L|| || ||Marama|| || || || ||
|-
!lrn 
| || ||I/L|| || ||Lorang|| || || || ||
|-
!lro 
| || ||I/L|| || ||Laro|| || || || ||
|-
!lrr 
| || ||I/L|| || ||Lorung, Southern|| || || || ||
|-
!lrt 
| || ||I/L|| || ||Larantuka Malay|| || || || ||
|-
!lrv 
| || ||I/L|| || ||Larevat|| || || || ||
|-
!lrz 
| || ||I/L|| || ||Lemerig|| || || || ||
|-
!lsa 
| || ||I/L|| || ||Lasgerdi|| || || || ||
|-
!lsd 
| || ||I/L|| || ||Lishana Deni|| || || || ||
|-
!lse 
| || ||I/L|| || ||Lusengo|| || || || ||
|-
!(lsg) 
| || ||I/L|| || ||Lyons Sign Language|| || ||里昂手语||лионский жестовый||
|-
!lsh 
| || ||I/L|| || ||Lish|| || || || ||
|-
!lsi 
| || ||I/L|| || ||Lashi|| || ||勒期语|| ||
|-
!lsl 
| || ||I/L|| || ||Latvian Sign Language|| || ||拉脱维亚手语||латвийский жестовый||
|-
!lsm 
| || ||I/L|| || ||Saamia|| || || || ||
|-
!lsn 
| || ||I/L|| || ||Tibetan Sign Language|| || || || ||
|-
!lso 
| || ||I/L|| || ||Laos Sign Language|| || ||老挝手语||лаосский жестовый||
|-
!lsp 
| || ||I/L|| || ||Panamanian Sign Language|| || ||巴拿马手语||панамский жестовый||
|-
!lsr 
| || ||I/L|| || ||Aruop|| || || || ||
|-
!lss 
| || ||I/L|| || ||Lasi|| || || || ||
|-
!lst 
| || ||I/L|| || ||Trinidad and Tobago Sign Language|| || ||特立尼达和多巴哥手语|| ||
|-
!lsv 
| || ||I/L|| || ||Sivia Sign Language|| || || || ||
|-
!lsy 
| || ||I/L|| || ||Mauritian Sign Language|| || || ||маврикийский жестовый||
|-
!ltc 
| || ||I/H||Chinese|| ||Late Middle Chinese|| || ||中古漢語||позднесредневековый китайский||
|-
!ltg 
| || ||I/L|| || ||Latgalian|| || || || ||
|-
!lth 
| || ||I/L||Nilo-Saharan|| ||Thur|| || || || ||
|-
!lti 
| || ||I/L|| || ||Leti (Indonesia)|| || || || ||
|-
!ltn 
| || ||I/L|| || ||Latundê|| || || || ||
|-
!lto 
| || ||I/L|| || ||Tsotso|| || || || ||
|-
!lts 
| || ||I/L|| || ||Tachoni|| || || || ||
|-
!ltu 
| || ||I/L|| || ||Latu|| || || || ||
|-
!ltz 
|lb||ltz||I/L||Indo-European||Lëtzebuergesch||Luxembourgish; Letzeburgesch||luxembourgeois||luxemburgués||卢森堡语||люксембургский||Luxemburgisch
|-
!lua 
| ||lua||I/L||Niger–Congo||lwaà:||Luba-Lulua||luba-lulua|| ||卢巴-卢拉语; 奇卢伯语|| ||
|-
!lub 
|lu||lub||I/L||Niger–Congo|| ||Luba-Katanga||luba-katanga|| ||卢巴-加丹加语; 卢巴卡丹加语||луба-катанга||
|-
!luc 
| || ||I/L|| || ||Aringa|| || || || ||
|-
!lud 
| || ||I/L|| ||lüüdi||Ludian||ludien|| || ||людиковский||
|-
!lue 
| || ||I/L|| || ||Luvale|| || ||卢瓦勒语|| ||
|-
!luf 
| || ||I/L|| || ||Laua|| || || || ||
|-
!lug 
|lg||lug||I/L||Niger–Congo||Luganda||Luganda||ganda||luganda||干达语; 卢干达语||ганда||Luganda
|-
!lui 
| ||lui||I/E|| || ||Luiseno||luiseno||luiseño||卢伊塞诺语||луисеньо||
|-
!luj 
| || ||I/L|| || ||Luna|| || || || ||
|-
!luk 
| || ||I/L|| || ||Lunanakha|| || || || ||
|-
!lul 
| || ||I/L|| || ||Olu'bo|| || || || ||
|-
!lum 
| || ||I/L|| || ||Luimbi|| || || || ||
|-
!lun 
| ||lun||I/L|| ||chiLunda||Lunda||lunda|| ||隆达语||лунда||
|-
!luo 
| ||luo||I/L|| ||Dholuo||Luo (Kenya and Tanzania)||luo|| ||卢奥语||луо||
|-
!lup 
| || ||I/L|| || ||Lumbu|| || || || ||
|-
!luq 
| || ||I/L|| ||Lucumí||Lucumi|| || || || ||
|-
!lur 
| || ||I/L|| || ||Laura|| || || || ||
|-
!lus 
| ||lus||I/L|| || ||Lushai||lushai||lusai||卢萨语|| ||
|-
!lut 
| || ||I/L|| ||Dəxʷləšucid||Lushootseed|| || || || ||
|-
!luu 
| || ||I/L|| || ||Lumba-Yakkha|| || || || ||
|-
!luv 
| || ||I/L|| || ||Luwati|| || || || ||
|-
!luw 
| || ||I/L|| || ||Luo|| || || || ||
|-
!luy 
| || ||M/L|| || ||Luyia|| || ||卢希亚语|| ||
|-
!luz 
| || ||I/L|| || ||Luri, Southern|| || ||南卢尔语|| ||
|-
!lva 
| || ||I/L|| || ||Maku'a|| || || || ||
|-
!lvi 
| || ||I/L||Austronesian|| ||Lavi|| || || || ||
|-
!lvk 
| || ||I/L|| || ||Lavukaleve|| || || || ||
|-
!lvs 
| || ||I/L|| || ||Standard Latvian|| || || ||стандартный латышский||
|-
!lvu 
| || ||I/L|| || ||Levuka|| || || || ||
|-
!lwa 
| || ||I/L|| || ||Lwalu|| || || || ||
|-
!lwe 
| || ||I/L|| || ||Lewo Eleng|| || || || ||
|-
!lwg 
| || ||I/L|| || ||Wanga|| || || || ||
|-
!lwh 
| || ||I/L|| || ||Lachi, White|| || ||白拉基语|| ||
|-
!lwl 
| || ||I/L|| || ||Lawa, Eastern|| || || || ||
|-
!lwm 
| || ||I/L|| || ||Laomian|| || || || ||
|-
!lwo 
| || ||I/L|| || ||Luwo|| || || || ||
|-
!lws 
| || ||I/L|| || ||Malawian Sign Language|| || || || ||
|-
!lwt 
| || ||I/L|| || ||Lewotobi|| || || || ||
|-
!lwu 
| || ||I/L|| || ||Lawu|| || || || ||
|-
!lww 
| || ||I/L|| || ||Lewo|| || || || ||
|-
!lya 
| || ||I/L|| || ||Layakha|| || || || ||
|-
!lyg 
| || ||I/L|| || ||Lyngngam|| || || || ||
|-
!lyn 
| || ||I/L|| || ||Luyana|| || || ||луяна||
|-
!lzh 
| || ||I/H||Chinese|| ||Literary Chinese|| || ||文言文|| ||
|-
!lzl 
| || ||I/L|| || ||Litzlitz|| || || || ||
|-
!lzn 
| || ||I/L|| || ||Leinong Naga|| || || || ||
|-
!lzz 
| || ||I/L|| ||ლაზური||Laz||laz(e)||lazo||拉兹语||лазский||
|}

ISO 639